The Rapid River is a river in Stikine Region, British Columbia, Canada.

See also
List of rivers of British Columbia

References

Rivers of British Columbia
Stikine Country